James Alexander Campbell Brown (1911–1965) was a psychiatrist who was born in Edinburgh, Scotland.

Career
He took a degree in medicine at the University of Edinburgh. He later traveled to mainland Europe where he studied in many countries. During the Second World War, he was a specialist in psychiatry in the Middle East. As well as practicing in the army, he also gained experience in mental hospitals, prisons and selection boards. Later he became interested in the normal individual's adjustment to society. He joined a large industrial concern after the war, where he worked for seven years.

Even though he learned in a school of thought which considered mental illness mainly as an individual and biological problem, he later regarded it basically as a social one. He took the view that the mental conflicts of the neurotic are in large part induced by the sick society in which he or she lives. Thus, he felt that the efficiency of industry cannot be weighed solely in terms of the amount goods it produces or its financial profits, but also considering at what cost of human health and happiness the goods were produced. He expressed this view in his work The Social Psychology of Industry (1954).

Works 
 The Social Psychology of Industry. Pelican Books, vol. no. 296. Penguin Books, Harmondsworth (Middlesex) 1954. https://doi.org/10.1037/14347-000
 Techniques of Persuasion. From propaganda to brainwashing. Pelican Books, vol. no. 604. Penguin Books, Harmondsworth (Middlesex) 1963. 325 p.
 The Distressed Mind. The thinker's library, vol. no. 115. Watts & Co., London 1946. 154 p.
 The Evolution of Society. The thinker's library, vol. no. 122. Watts & Co., London 1947. 184 p.
 Freud and the Post-Freudians. Pelican Books. Penguin Books, Harmondsworth (Middlesex) 1961. 225 p.

References 

1911 births
1964 deaths
Scottish psychiatrists
Alumni of the University of Edinburgh
20th-century Scottish medical doctors